Ammonitoceras is an extinct genus of cephalopod belonging to the ammonite subclass that lived during the latter part of the Early Cretaceous in what is now Europe and the transcaspian region. Ammonitoceras was named by Dumas, 1876, the type-species: Ammonitoceras ucetiae.

Although the description doesn't mention a hook, as in Ancyloceras or Acrioceras, Ammonitoceras is included in the Ancyloceratidae.  However neither do Australiceras or Tropaeum, which are also included.

References

Arkell et al., 1957. Mesozoic Ammonoidea, Treatise on Invertebrate Paleontology Part L, Geological Society of America and University of Kansas press.

Early Cretaceous ammonites of Europe
Ancyloceratoidea
Ammonitida genera